Payang Town, also Paryang, is a town and township in Zhongba County, Shigatse, in southern Tibet, China, to the west of Zhongba Town by road.

Villages
Some of villages under Payang township:

 Dakdokarchung
 Namozaema
 Tsempu
 Toonla

References

Populated places in Shigatse
Township-level divisions of Tibet
Zhongba County